Aldrin Muscat (born 11 September 1971) is a retired Maltese football striker. He became Maltese Premier League top goalscorer in 1995–96.

References

1971 births
Living people
Maltese footballers
Sliema Wanderers F.C. players
Association football forwards
Malta under-21 international footballers
Malta international footballers